The furry fandom is a subculture interested in anthropomorphic animal characters. Examples of anthropomorphic attributes include exhibiting human intelligence and facial expressions, speaking, walking on two legs, and wearing clothes. The term "furry fandom" is also used to refer to the community of people who gather on the internet and at furry conventions.

History
The furry fandom has its roots in the underground comix movement of the 1970s, a genre of comic books that depicts explicit content. In 1976, a pair of cartoonists created the amateur press association Vootie, which was dedicated to animal-focused art. Many of its featured works contained adult themes, such as "Omaha" the Cat Dancer, which contained explicit sex. Vootie grew a small following over the next several years, and its contributors began meeting at science fiction and comics conventions.

According to fandom historian Fred Patten, the concept of furry originated at a science fiction convention in 1980, when a character drawing from Steve Gallacci's Albedo Anthropomorphics started a discussion of anthropomorphic characters in science fiction novels. This led to the formation of a discussion group that met at science fiction conventions and comics conventions.

The specific term furry fandom was being used in fanzines as early as 1983, and had become the standard name for the genre by the mid-1990s, when it was defined as "the organized appreciation and dissemination of art and prose regarding 'Furries', or fictional mammalian anthropomorphic characters". However, fans consider the origins of furry fandom to be much earlier, with fictional works such as Kimba, the White Lion, released in 1965, Richard Adams' novel Watership Down, published in 1972 (and its 1978 film adaptation), as well as Disney's Robin Hood as oft-cited examples. Internet newsgroup discussion in the 1990s created some separation between fans of "funny animal" characters and furry characters, meant to avoid the baggage that was associated with the term "furry".

During the 1980s, furry fans began to publish fanzines, developing a diverse social group that eventually began to schedule social gatherings. By 1989, there was sufficient interest to stage the first furry convention. It was called Confurence 0, and was held at the Holiday Inn Bristol Plaza in Costa Mesa, California. The next decade, the internet became accessible to the general population and became the most popular means for furry fans to socialize. The newsgroup alt.fan.furry was created in November 1990, and virtual environments such as MUCKs also became popular places on the internet for fans to meet and communicate.

Inspiration
Allegorical novels, including works of both science fiction and fantasy, and cartoons featuring anthropomorphic animals are often cited as the earliest inspiration for the fandom. A survey conducted in 2007 suggested that, when compared with a non-furry control group, a higher proportion of those self-identifying as furries liked cartoons "a great deal" as children and recalled watching them significantly more often, as well as being more likely to enjoy works of science fiction than those outside of the community.

Activities
According to a survey from 2008, most furries believe that visual art, conventions, literature, and online communities are strongly important to the fandom. The furry fandom is male-dominated, with surveys reporting around 80% male respondents.

Crafts

Fans with craft skills create their own plush toys, sometimes referred to as plushies, and also build elaborate costumes called fursuits, which are worn for fun or to participate in parades, convention masquerades, dances, or fund-raising charity events (as entertainers). Fursuits range from designs featuring simple construction and resembling sports mascots to those with more sophisticated features that include moving jaw mechanisms, animatronic parts, prosthetic makeup, and other features. Fursuits range in price from $500, for mascot-like designs, to an upwards of $10,000 for models incorporating animatronics. While about 80% of furries do not own a full fursuit, often citing their expensive cost as the decisive factor, a majority of them hold positive feelings towards fursuiters and the conventions in which they participate. Some fans may also wear "partial" suits consisting simply of ears and a tail, or a head, paws, and a tail.

Furry fans also pursue puppetry, recording videos and performing live shows such as Rapid T. Rabbit and Friends and the Funday PawPet Show, and create furry accessories, such as ears or tails.

Role-playing

Anthropomorphic animal characters created by furry fans, known as fursonas, are used for role-playing in MUDs, on internet forums, or on electronic mailing lists. A variety of species are employed as the basis of these personas, although many furry fans (for example over 60% of those surveyed in 2007) choose to identify themselves with carnivorans. The longest-running online furry role-playing environment is FurryMUCK, which was established in 1990. Many furry fans had their first exposure to the fandom come from multiplayer online role-playing games. Another popular online furry social game is called Furcadia, created by Dragon's Eye Productions. There are also several furry-themed areas and communities in the virtual world Second Life.

Conventions

Sufficient interest and membership has enabled the creation of many furry conventions in North America and Europe. A furry convention is for the fans get together to buy and sell artwork, participate in workshops, wear costumes, and socialize. Anthrocon, in 2008 the largest furry convention with more than 5,861 attendees, is estimated to have generated approximately $3 million to Pittsburgh's economy that year. Another convention, Further Confusion, held in San Jose each January, closely follows Anthrocon in scale and attendance. US$470,000 was raised in conventions for charity from 2000 to 2009. As of December 2017, Midwest FurFest is the world's largest furry convention. It had a self-reported 2019 attendance of 11,019.

The first known furry convention, ConFurence, is no longer held; Califur has replaced it, as both conventions were based in Southern California. A University of California, Davis survey suggested that about 40% of furries had attended at least one furry convention.

Websites and online communities
The internet contains a multitude of furry websites and online communities, such as art community websites Fur Affinity, Inkbunny, SoFurry and Weasyl; social networking sites Furry 4 Life and FurNation; and WikiFur, a collaborative furry wiki.

There are several webcomics featuring animal characters created by or for furry fans; as such, they may be referred to as furry comics. One such comic, T.H.E. Fox, was first published on CompuServe in 1986, predating the World Wide Web by several years, while another, Kevin and Kell by Bill Holbrook, has been awarded both a Web Cartoonists' Choice Award and an Ursa Major Award.

Furry lifestyle

The phrases furry lifestyle and furry lifestyler first appeared in July 1996 on the newsgroup alt.fan.furry during an ongoing dispute within that online community. The Usenet newsgroup alt.lifestyle.furry was created to accommodate discussion beyond furry art and literature, and to resolve disputes concerning what should or should not be associated with the fandom; its members quickly adopted the term furry lifestylers, and still consider the fandom and the lifestyle to be separate social entities. They have defined and adopted an alternative meaning of the word furry specific to this group: "a person with an important emotional/spiritual connection with an animal or animals, real, fictional, or symbolic."

In their 2007 survey, Gerbasi et al. examined what it meant to be a furry, and proposed a taxonomy in which to categorise different "types" of furries. The largest group—38% of those surveyed—described their interest in furry fandom predominantly as a "route to socializing with others who share common interests such as anthropomorphic art and costumes." However they also identified furries who saw themselves as "other than human", or who desired to become more like the furry species which they identified with.

Sexual aspects

When compared with the general population, homosexuality and bisexuality are over-represented in the furry fandom by about a factor of 10. Of the adult US population, about 3.1% of those polled identify as bisexual, 1.4% as gay, and 0.7% as lesbian according to a 2020 Gallup update. In contrast, according to four different surveys 14–25% of the fandom members report homosexuality, 37–52% bisexuality, 28–51% heterosexuality, and 3–8% other forms of alternative sexual relationships. Approximately half of the respondents reported being in a relationship, of which 76% were in a relationship with another member of the furry fandom. Examples of sexual aspects within the furry fandom include erotic art and furry-themed cybersex. The term "yiff" is sometimes used to indicate sexual activity or sexual material within the fandom—this applies to sexual activity and interaction within the subculture whether in the form of cybersex or offline.

Sexual attraction to furry characters is a polarizing issue. In one survey with 4,300 furry respondents, 37% answered that sexual attraction is important in their furry activities, 38% were ambivalent, and 24% answered that it has little or nothing to do with their furry activities. In an earlier online survey, 33% of furry respondents answered that they have a "significant sexual interest in furry", another 46% stated they have a "minor sexual interest in furry", and the remaining 21% stated they have a "non-sexual interest in furry". The survey specifically avoided adult-oriented websites to prevent bias.

Another survey at a furry convention in 2013 found that 96.3% of male furry respondents reported viewing furry pornography, compared with 78.3% of female; males estimated 50.9% of all furry art they view is pornographic, compared with 30.7% female. The respondents to the survey had a slight preference for pornographic furry artwork over non-pornographic artwork. 17.1% of males reported that when they viewed pornography it was exclusively or near-exclusively furry pornography, and only about 5% reported that pornography was the top factor which got them into the fandom.

An anonymous survey conducted by the Furry Research Center in 2008 found 17% of respondents identified as zoophiles. An earlier survey, conducted from 1997 to 1998, reported about 2% of furry respondents stating an interest in zoophilia, and less than 1% an interest in plushophilia (sexually aroused by stuffed animal toys). It has been suggested that the older, lower results, which are even lower than estimated in the general population, were due to the methodology of questioning respondents face-to-face, which may have led to social desirability bias.

Public perception and media coverage
Early portrayal of the furries in magazines such as Wired, Loaded, Vanity Fair, and the syndicated sex column "Savage Love" focused mainly on the sexual aspect of furry fandom. Fictional portrayals of furry fandom have appeared on television shows such as The Simpsons, ER, CSI: Crime Scene Investigation, The Drew Carey Show, Sex2K on MTV, Entourage, 1000 Ways to Die, Tosh.0, Check It Out! with Dr. Steve Brule, and 30 Rock. Most furry fans claim that these media portrayals are misconceptions, while more recent coverage focuses on addressing the myths and stereotypes that have come to be associated with the furry fandom. A reporter attending Anthrocon 2006 noted that "despite their wild image from Vanity Fair, MTV and CSI, furry conventions aren't about kinky sex between weirdos gussied up in foxy costumes", that conference attendees were "not having sex more than the rest of us", and that the furry convention was about "people talking and drawing animals and comic-book characters in sketchbooks." In October 2007, a Hartford Advocate reporter attended FurFright 2007 undercover because of media restrictions. She learned that the restrictions were intended to prevent misinformation, and reported that the scandalous behavior she had expected was not evident. Recent coverage of the furry fandom has been more balanced. According to Ian Wolf, a 2009 article from the BBC entitled "Who are the furries?" was the first piece of journalism to be nominated for an Ursa Major Award, the main awards given in the field of anthropomorphism.

Milwaukee Brewers broadcaster Jim Powell was sharing a hotel with Anthrocon 2007 attendees a day before the convention and reported a negative opinion of the furries. Several downtown Pittsburgh businesses welcome furries during the event, with local business owners creating special T-shirts and drawing paw prints in chalk outside their shops to attract attendees. Dr. Samuel Conway, CEO of Anthrocon, said that "For the most part, people give us curious stares, but they're good-natured curious stares. We're here to have fun, people have fun having us here, everybody wins". Positive coverage was generated following a furry convention that was held in a Vancouver hotel where a number of Syrian refugees were being temporarily housed. Despite some concerns and warnings by staff that there could be a seriously negative culture clash if the two groups interacted, the refugee children were on the whole delighted to meet the convention goers, especially the ones in fursuits, who seemed like cartoon characters come to life.

According to Furry survey, about half of furries perceive public reaction to the fandom as negative; less than a fifth stated that the public responded to them more negatively than they did most furries. Furry fans' belief that they will be portrayed as "mainly obsessed with sex" has led to mistrust of the media and social researchers.

In addition, the fandom has grown to be such a significant demographic that by 2016, the film company Walt Disney Studios marketed their animated feature film Zootopia in pre-release to the fandom to encourage interest in the film, which proved a major critical and commercial success.

In 2021 and 2022, media coverage in Canada and the United States focused on false rumors about litter boxes in schools being provided for furries, which was part of a cultural backlash amplified by conservative and far-right politicians against transgender accommodations in schools.

Sociological aspects

The International Anthropomorphic Research Project (IARP), a team of social scientists from various disciplines led by Plante, Reysen, Roberts, and Gerbasi, has been collecting data on the furry fandom using numerous methodologies. Their 2016 publication collects several peer-reviewed and self-published studies into a single volume. Among their findings were that the average adult furry is between 23 and 27 years of age, with more than 75% of furries reporting being 25 years of age or younger, and 88% of adult furries being under the age of 30. Minors were not included in the study for professional ethics reasons however IARP estimated 20% were under the age of 18. 78–85% of furries identify as male, the remaining identify as female; while most are cisgender, 2% are transgender. 83–90% of furries self-identify as White, with small minorities of furries self-identifying as Asian (2–4%), Black (2–3%), and Hispanic (3%). 21% of furries consider themselves to be bronies, 44% consider themselves to be anime fans, and 11% consider themselves sport fans. Furries, as a group, are more politically liberal and less religious than the average American or other comparable fan groups such as anime fans, while still containing contentious groups such as neo-Nazis and alt-right activists whose affiliation is partly in jest and partly in earnest. In terms of religious preference, 23.5% of furries self-identified as Christian, 16.8% as atheist, 16.8% as agnostic, 11.0% as Pagan/Wiccan, 2.4% as Buddhist, 1.2% as Jewish, 1.1% as Deist, 0.9% as Satanist, and 26.2% as "other" (including "participants who had their own belief systems, were undecided, refused to answer, or had uncommon belief systems"). Approximately 70% of adult furries have either completed, or are currently completing post-secondary education.

One of the most universal behaviors in the furry fandom is the creation of a fursona—an anthropomorphic animal representation or avatar. More than 95% of furries have a fursona. Nearly half of furries report that they have only ever had one fursona to represent themselves; relatively few furries have had more than three or four fursonas; in part, this is due to the fact that, for many furries, their fursonas are a personally significant, meaningful representation of their ideal self. The most popular fursona species include wolves, foxes, dogs, large felines, and dragons. Data suggests that there is generally no association between personality traits and different fursona species. However, furries report different degrees of personality traits when thinking of themselves in their everyday identity compared with their fan identity. Some furries identify as partly non-human: 35% say they do not feel 100% human (compared with 7% of non-furries), and 39% say they would be 0% human if they could (compared with 10% of non-furries).

Inclusion and belongingness are central themes in the furry fandom: compared with members of other fandoms such as anime or fantasy sport, furries are significantly more likely to identify with other members of their fan community. On average, half of a furry's friends are also furry themselves. Furries rate themselves higher (compared with a comparison community sample of non-furries) on degree of global awareness (knowledge of the world and felt connection to others in the world), global citizenship identification (psychological connection with global citizens), and environmental sustainability.

See also

Topics
 Animal roleplay
 Costumed character
 Human–animal hybrid
 Kemonomimi

People
 Samuel Conway
 Dominique McLean

Documentaries
 Fursonas
 The Fandom

Related fandoms/subcultures
 Brony
 Otaku

References

Further reading
 Ferreday, Debra. "Becoming deer: Nonhuman drag and online utopias." Feminist Theory 12.2 (2011): 219–225.
 Hilton, Craig. "Furry Fandom—An Insider's View from the Outside", parts 1 & 2. South Fur Lands #2 & #3, 1995, 1996.
 Martin, Watts. Mange: the need for criticism in furrydom 1994, 1998 (Archive.org mirror)
 Morgan, Matt. Creature Comfort: Anthropomorphism, Sexuality and Revitalization in the Furry Fandom. Diss. Mississippi State University, 2008.
 Probyn-Rapsey, Fiona. "Furries and the Limits of Species Identity Disorder: A Response to Gerbasi et al." Society and Animals 19.3 (2011): 294–301.
 Plante, C. N., Reysen, S., Roberts, S.E., & Gerbasi, K. C. (2016). FurScience! A summary of Five Years of Research from the International Anthropomorphic Research Project. Waterloo, Ontario: FurScience.

External links

 
 

 
Anthropomorphic animal characters
Subcultures
Types of communities